Rafael Ernesto Barrientos Cruz (born May 12, 1979) is a retired Salvadoran footballer.

Club career
Nicknamed el Chele, Barrientos started his career at FAS, where he played alongside talented teenagers Gilberto Murgas and Eliseo Quintanilla. He then joined C.D. Luis Ángel Firpo with whom he would stay for three years. In 2004, he moved to Alianza F.C., only to leave them after a year for Once Municipal with whom he would win the 2006 Apertura. He signed for Nejapa F.C. in 2007 and finished his career in December 2009.

International career
Barrientos made his debut for El Salvador in a July 2000 friendly match against Mexico and has earned a total of 12 caps, scoring no goals. He has represented his country in 3 FIFA World Cup qualification matches and played at the 2001 UNCAF Nations Cup.

His final international was the June 2001 UNCAF Cup match against Costa Rica.

References

External links

 ¿Qué Pasó con... el chele barrientos ? - El Salvador.com 

1979 births
Living people
Sportspeople from San Salvador
Association football midfielders
Salvadoran footballers
El Salvador international footballers
C.D. FAS footballers
C.D. Luis Ángel Firpo footballers
Alianza F.C. footballers
Once Municipal footballers
Nejapa footballers
2001 UNCAF Nations Cup players